Kurt Paul Schmitt (7 October 1886 – 2 November 1950) was a German jurist versed in economic matters. A supporter of the Nazis since 1930, he joined the Nazi party in 1933, becoming also an honorary SS. He presided over Allianz insurance company, and was the Reich Economy Minister from 1933 to 1934. His antisemitic views let him believe that the role Jews played in politics, law and the arts was excessive, and had to be drastically curtailed if not totally eliminated.

Biography
Born in Heidelberg, jurist Kurt Schmitt graduated in 1911 in Munich with the thesis "The Ongoing Information File, in Particular the Information Convention", and then went into the service of the Allianz AG insurance company. From 1914 to 1917 he participated in the First World War and was discharged having reached the rank of captain. In 1917, he became a member of the Allianz board of directors, leading the company from 1921 to 1933 as chairman of the board. During these years, he made a name for himself as one of the most gifted leaders when it came to organization in the Weimar Republic's insurance industry.

Allianz's leadership, represented by directors Kurt Schmitt and Eduard Hilgard, led a policy of drawing nearer to the Nazis, even before they seized power. Already in October 1930, ties were forged with Hermann Göring. These contacts were realized through company dinners and by providing private financial loans. Heinrich Brüning and Franz von Papen tried without success to get Schmitt a ministerial office.

Schmitt, who was also General Director of the Stuttgart Social Insurance Corporation (Stuttgarter Verein-Versicherungs AG) by 1931, was included in Hjalmar Schacht's objectives in mid-1931.

On 18 December 1932 he participated in a meeting of the Circle of Friends of the Economy (Freundeskreis der Wirtschaft), or Circle of Twelve (Zwölferkreis) at the Berlin Kaiserhof, where the Nazi Party agreed to lend its support. Schmitt now had closer relations with the Nazi leadership and on 20 February 1933, he, along with Hermann Göring, took part in a meeting that Adolf Hitler had with German industrialists, at which Schmitt made an election campaign donation to the Nazis of RM 10,000. In early 1933, Schmitt joined the Nazi Party (membership no. 2,651,252). He likewise took over the posts of Vice President of the Berlin Chamber of Industry and of the Chamber of Commerce in 1933.

Meanwhile, Schmitt was convinced that the Nazis could deal with the problem of joblessness if the economy was led by people like him. Furthermore, he held Hitler to be a great statesman and believed that over time, the Führer would grow to become less radical. Moreover, he had a latent anti-Semitic attitude, which Gerald D. Feldmann describes as follows: "Schmitt shared the belief that Jews were overrepresented within the academic professions, and that the rôle that they played in politics, law, and the arts would have to be greatly limited, if not utterly eliminated. He believed, however, that they were entitled to a place in German economic life, and made it into a maxim of his year in office as Reich Economy Minister that there was no "Jewish question in the economy".(2)

On 29 June 1933 Schmitt was appointed Reich Economy Minister, succeeding Alfred Hugenberg, and he also took on honorary membership in the SS (no. 101,346). In August 1933 he took the function of Prussian Plenipotentiary in the Reich Government. In October of the same year he was appointed to the Prussian State Council. The Academy for German Law also took him on as a member.

On 13 March 1934 Schmitt made known what the new arrangement would be for the industrial economy. The leader of the overall organization of the industrial economy was to be Philipp Kessler, as leader of the Reich Federation of the Electrical Industry. When Schmitt wanted to replace the Reich Federation of German Industry with overall state control, he ran up against concentrated resistance from business leaders. Furthermore, Hjalmar Schacht undertook efforts to oust Schmitt from his ministerial office so that he could take it over himself. (3) During a speech on 28 June 1934 Schmitt had a heart attack and collapsed. He used this opportunity to go on a long recuperative holiday, and later, on 31 January 1935, Hitler approved his dismissal from ministerial office. On 3 August 1934 Schacht became Schmitt's successor as Reich Economy Minister.

After coming back from his extended leave in 1935, he took over the chairmanship in the supervisory board of AEG AG and the Deutsche Continental Gasgesellschaft (a gas company) in Dessau. In 1937, and until 1945, he held the board chairmanship of Münchener Rückversicherung AG. He was also on Allianz AG's supervisory board until 1945. As a member of the Freundeskreis Reichsführer-SS, Heinrich Himmler promoted him to SS-Brigadeführer on 15 September 1935. (4) Since Schmitt was functioning as AEG supervisory board chairman, they donated to Himmler between RM 12,000 and 15,000 yearly, and Münchner Rückversicherung and Continental Gasgesellschaft between RM 6,000 and 8,000.

From 1945 to 1949, Schmitt had to undergo Denazification, administered by the United States Army. He lost all his offices, and he was barred from practising his profession. In 1946 he was classified as a Hauptschuldiger (lit. "main culprit"). This designation was reviewed in several court proceedings, and was overturned in 1949. He would now only be classified as a Mitläufer, or follower. He nevertheless still had to pay a fine and the court costs.

Decorations 
In 1914, Schmitt was awarded the Iron Cross 2nd class. He also received the Verwundetenabzeichen in black, an award given wounded soldiers. Further decorations: the War Merit Cross first class without swords, the War Merit Cross 2nd class without swords. From the SS he received the "Reichsführer-SS Sword of Honour" and the "Totenkopfring der SS" (SS Death's Head Ring).

References

Literature 
 (1) Gerald D. Feldman, Die Allianz und die deutsche Versicherungswirtschaft 1933 bis 1945, C.H. Beck Verlag, Munich 2001
 (5) August Heinrichsbauer, Schwerindistrie und Politik, Essen 1948 
 (6) Ulrich Völklein, Geschäfte mit dem Feind, Hamburg 2002,

External links 
 Picture of Kurt Schmitt
  (in German)
 See Wachsende Gegensätze (in German)
 Schmitt as a member of Himmler's circle of friends 
 

1886 births
1950 deaths
Economy ministers of Germany
German economists
Ludwig Maximilian University of Munich alumni
Members of the Academy for German Law
Nazi Germany ministers
Nazi Party officials
People from the Grand Duchy of Baden
Politicians from Heidelberg
Recipients of the Iron Cross (1914), 2nd class
SS-Brigadeführer